Rijeka, formerly known as Fiume, is a city located in the northern tip of the Kvarner Gulf in the northern Adriatic. It is currently the third-largest city in Croatia. It was part of the Roman province of Dalmatia, and later of the Kingdom of Croatia. It grew during the 12th to 14th centuries as a seaport within the Holy Roman Empire, trading with Italian cities. Under the rule of the House of Habsburg from 1466, it was made a free city; and, although part of the Duchy of Carniola, it developed local self-government.

During the 16th and 17th centuries, Rijeka came under attack from both Turkish and Venetian forces, and became a base for irregular Habsburg troops known as Uskoks. Its maritime trade was suppressed by Venice until the late 17th century, when peace was concluded, and the Habsburgs set about developing the city as a major port, with sugar refineries and other industries being introduced. Rijeka was attached to the Kingdom of Hungary in 1779, retaining its autonomous status, although the Kingdom of Croatia also maintained a claim.

Between 1809 and 1813, Rijeka was occupied by Napoleonic France as part of the Illyrian Provinces. After the reconquest by Austria, it was placed within the Kingdom of Illyria until 1822 and then restored to Hungary. Industrial development recommenced, the port was modernized, a naval base established, and railways connecting the city with Hungary and Serbia were constructed. Under the Austro-Hungarian Compromise of 1867, Hungary gained equal status with Austria; and Rijeka, as Hungary's main port, became a rival to Austria's port of Trieste. Under the leadership of Giovanni de Ciotta the city was extensively rebuilt during the late 19th century. As the result of further industrial expansion and immigration, Italians became the largest single group in the city.

Upon the defeat and dissolution of the Austro-Hungarian monarchy in 1918, Italy and the new Kingdom of the Serbs, Croats and Slovenes (later the Kingdom of Yugoslavia) both laid claim to Rijeka. Negotiations in 1919 at the Paris Peace Conference were pre-empted by a coup, led by Gabriele D'Annunzio, that established the Italian Regency of Carnaro, which was based in the city. The coup was suppressed by Italian troops the next year, and under the Treaty of Rapallo the independent Free State of Fiume was established. However, in 1924, after Benito Mussolini became ruler in Italy, Rijeka (as Fiume) was annexed to Italy.

Rijeka was occupied by German troops in 1943, after Italy came to terms with the Allies of World War II; and it experienced extensive damage from Allied bombing. After fierce fighting, it was captured on 3 May 1945 by Yugoslav forces and was later annexed to the Socialist Republic of Croatia under the Paris peace treaty of 1947. Most of the Italian population fled or were removed, and were subsequently replaced by immigrants from other parts of Yugoslavia. Rijeka became the largest port in Yugoslavia, and economic growth sectors included port traffic, oil, and coal. On the breakup of Yugoslavia in 1991, Rijeka became part of independent Croatia, but has experienced economic difficulties, with the closure of many of its older industries.

Origins 

The region of Quarnero (Fiume was still not mentioned) was part of the Holy Roman Empire. With the acquisition of the titles of Margraves of Istria and Dukes of Merania by the Andechs family, the possession was called Merania ( – "sea"), meaning "littoral".

The counts of Duino (Tibein), were feudal lords of Fiume from the early 12th century until 1337. As ministeriales of the Patriarchate of Aquileia, the family proved crucial in extending German control to the northern Adriatic coast and preventing further expansion of the Republic of Venice. The counts of Duino built a good road network over the land around the city. The Fiuman terra, their most important fief, dominated the natural routes leading from the Timavo River toward the Quarnero gulf. Several castles and outposts—Senožeče, Gotnik (Guettenegg), and Prem—guarded these land routes, from the Quarnero to Carniola, a part of modern Slovenia. Traders came from Carinthian Villach, Carniolan Ljubljana (Laibach), Styrian Ptuj (Pettau), and from the German lands of the Holy Roman Empire.

In Fiume, the local toponymy derives predominantly from Slavic Croatian. Italians came by sea from the central-Italian Adriatic ports—such as Fermo, Ancona, Senigallia, and Venice—usually as craftsmen and traders. The trade of Fiume linked the German lands with central Italian ports. Notably, there was little contact with Croatia, which was due to the absence of land connections from Fiume into its eastern hinterland.

In 1399, the territory came under the German family of Walsee, the last of whom sold the territory to the Habsburgs in 1465. The Habsburgs possessed it from 1466 to 1776, during which time Fiume was granted the status of a free city as part of the Duchy of Carniola. As a reichsfrei city, or territory (Fiume was a terra), the city was under the direct authority of the Holy Roman Emperor and the Imperial Diet, without any intermediary liege lord. The advantages were that reichsfrei regions had the right to collect taxes and tolls themselves, and to hold their own juridical courts. Imperial immediacy corresponded to a de facto semi-independence with a far-reaching autonomy. In 1599, Fiume became a de facto independent city commune, emancipated from the Duchy of Carniola, although the Carniolan estates continued unsuccessfully to claim their rights upon the city – right up to their cessation in 1809.

From 1530, the late-medieval commune was ruled according to the Statute of Fiume, this charter formally lasting until 1850. The first codified statute preserves some features of the medieval Croatian statutes, still with a preponderance of Italian and Venetian institutions. According to the statute, the executive power was in the hands of a great council (Gran Consiglio) of 50 members and a lesser council (Piccolo Consiglio) of 25 patricians. The Captain was the representative of the feudal lord (from 1466 the Habsburg archduke). The local executives, justice rectors (giudici rettori), have to obey only the lord – from 1466 the duke (later emperor) of the House of Habsburg. Thus, in its local corporate representation, Fiume was a mixture of a tradition of local self-government and the Reichsfreiheit or Reichsunmittelbarkeit of the free cities of the Holy Roman Empire.

Turkish wars 

By the 19th century, Fiume had become the most important port in the eastern half of the Habsburg empire, but its beginnings were modest: at the dawn of the modern age, it was still small, with fewer than 5,000 inhabitants.

After the disaster of the Battle of Mohács in 1526, the Kingdom of Croatia and the Kingdom of Hungary accepted the sovereignty of the Habsburgs in order to defend themselves from Turkish invasions. After 1526, the stretch of territory (the littoral) south of Fiume and north of the Zrmanja River was held by the House of Austria, when it inherited the crowns of Croatia and Hungary. Venetian Dalmatia included the lands south of Cattaro. As such, these lands were permanently on the frontline, intended to bring to a halt the Ottoman advance that stopped short of the Gulf of Quarnero.

Until the late 17th century, the Habsburg monarchy possessed essentially a landlocked territory, whose trade and traffic followed the commercial routes to the north and northwest, with Hamburg as the main port for Austrian products. When these routes became vulnerable to the growing Prussian state, the monarchy started to turn towards its southern possessions. The trade of Fiume still languished, since the Habsburgs favored Trieste for all Austrian exports, also because land communications thorough Fiume were insecure.

From 1469 to 1502, Turkish attacks in Croatia and the environs of Fiume were particularly frequent, with the near absence of any organised defence. The threat from the Ottoman Empire kept the monarchy engaged in permanent military actions and in concluding alliances with Christian states, with Venice being one of them. The northern Adriatic thus functioned as an Ottoman, Venetian, and Habsburg borderland.

For centuries, the regional border was indistinct and mobile: the Croatian littoral and its hinterland were an integrated part of the Habsburg military frontier, which was more than defensive; and whose military nature marked the stages of societal development in the area. Its principal characteristic was that the various fortresses were manned by regular and irregular troops for permanent, low-intensity warfare, which included raiding as its main source of revenue. Incursions of armed bands—from the Ottoman side, the irregular Hajduks and Uskoks, as well as the local frontier troops (Grenzers)—occurred on a daily basis.

Probably no phenomenon describes the turbulent events in the area better than the Uskoks' piracy and banditry in the northern Adriatic. For a century, Uskoks served as irregulars in the Habsburg border garrison of Senj. The Habsburgs and the Pope celebrated the irregulars' role as a bulwark of Christendom, while for the Venetians (laity and priests alike) they were "bandits and pirates worse than the Turks and responsible for innumerable atrocities". For much of the 16th century, Fiume's history is very much that of the Uskoks. In fact, the city survived as a port of trade principally thanks to the afflux of the merchandise they pillaged. It was a world where life was precarious and trade degenerated into a raiding economy. In 1530, Venice, knowing that the Uskoks had Fiume as their main "emporium", sacked and burned the city during a punitive expedition. Uskok piracy became a serious diplomatic problem between Austria and Venice, which was resolved in 1617 with the Treaty of Madrid, by which the emperor discontinued his support of the Uskoks.

The repeated attempts of Habsburg emperors to expand and enlarge the tiny fishing villages of the northern Adriatic into functioning ports had previously failed because of the domination of Venice, which controlled the entire Adriatic and fiercely opposed development of the Habsburg ports, which led to a series of destructive Venetian occupations of Fiume, from 1508 to 1512, 1530, 1599, and, finally, in 1612. Fiume's maritime traffic was reduced to cabotage, since Venice controlled routes across the sea. Habsburg emperors unsuccessfully tried to break this domination of the sea, claiming free shipping for all and formulating it in treaties and diplomatic agreements.

Only with the defeat of the Turks, at the end of the 17th century, could new attempts be undertaken. With the Treaty of Karlovitz (1699), the empire regained control over the vast plains of Vojvodina and Banat, which were promptly put under the direct control of the Imperial Chamber (Kaiserliche Hofkammer) of Inner Austria, as an Imperial Regency whose seat was in Graz, to finance the further military requirements against the Ottomans.

The emporium 

The origins of the emporium date from the late 17th century, when mercantilism found its way into the Habsburg lands. In 1666, under Emperor Leopold I, a commerz collegium was founded in Vienna, an office whose main function was to initiate economic reforms and control their implementation. Based upon mercantilistic principles, a homogeneous "littoral district" was to be created along the Adriatic coast.

Besides the local and, up to that time, unimportant ports of Trieste and Fiume, the plan also encompassed the integration of Croatian territories seized from the Ottoman Empire during the second half of the 17th century: the Bay of Bakar, Senj, and Karlobag, where the Habsburgs competed with powerful local landlords who had started to develop as ports some of the coastal towns they owned. The Zrinski (Zriny) were the most powerful landowners in Croatia; and most of the land that surrounded Fiume, as well as the city of Bakar (Buccari), was in their hands. They developed the port of Buccari, the best natural harbour in the area and comparatively well connected with the hinterland. An alliance with Venice and lower taxes explain the success of Buccari, where soon the rise in traffic vastly outpaced that of the Habsburg port of Fiume. Buccari had a lazaretto founded by a Venetian company. The other family were the Frankopan (Frangipane), who owned and developed the port of Kraljevica (Portorè). These developments came to an abrupt end with the Zrinski-Frankopan conspiracy. After the defeat of the rebellion in 1673, all these possessions were confiscated and put under the control of the Hungarian Aulic Council and were soon transferred to the Imperial Chamber of Inner Austria.

The destruction of the most powerful feudal families and their economic might meant that between Vienna and the Adriatic ports there were no feudal lords capable of competing or disturbing the Habsburgs' plans for economic development. One of the obstacles in the way of the implementation of these plans was the Venetian monopoly in the Adriatic, which effectively prevented ships from other countries sailing freely on this closed sea, at the time known also as the "Gulf of Venice". Habsburg success was achieved under Charles VI. In 1717, after another victorious campaign against the Ottomans (but this time with Venice as its ally) the Adriatic sea was promptly declared free for trade, with Venice no longer opposing it. In 1718, peace was concluded with the Ottoman Empire, and a commercial treaty brought important commercial liberties to the Ottoman and Habsburg subjects. In 1719, Trieste and Fiume were declared free ports of the empire.

In 1723 the Gran Consiglio of the Fiuman commune was put under the Circle of Inner Austria with its seat at Graz. The captain, as a representative of the emperor, held the executive power over governmental economic policy. Progressively, Fiume was included in a broader institutional framework aimed at the economic development of the whole empire, and was increasingly included as part of Hungary. That Hungarian influence was on the rise is reflected in the fact that Fiume, as a Free City, accepted the Pragmatic Sanction in 1723, the same year as did the Hungarian Diet and the other Habsburg lands, while the "sister city" of Trieste had done so ten years earlier, in 1713. Charles VI intended for Trieste to link Austrian lands to his remaining Spanish possessions – Naples. Fiume was to provide a link to Hungary and the Banat of Temesvar, where the colony of Spanish exiles of Nova Barcelona was to be founded.

The project failed, but links between Fiume and the Banat of Temesvar remained strong. In 1741, under the reign of Maria Theresa (1740–1780), the Comercien Ober Directorium (Commercial High Directory) was formed in Vienna, to oversee all the commercial affairs of the empire. In 1745, Maria Theresa united the administrations of all the ports within an Oberste Commerz-Intendenza (High Commercial Intendancy), which originally had been established by her father in 1731.

Fiume, instead of being a kreisamt (district seat), was subordinated to a gubernium (governorate) and had a Direzione Superiore Commerciale (Kommerzassesorium) subordinated to the Cesarea Regia Intendenza Commerciale per il Litorale at Trieste. From 1748 to 1776, the Intendenza was the first provincial imperial institution to govern the city. In 1749, Maria Theresa issued the Haupt Resolution by which the civil and military Capitan of Trieste was placed under the control of the Comercien Ober Directorium at Vienna. All the littoral region, in fact, became a territorial dependency of this new institution, which was specifically concerned with the development of commerce; and thus the littoral was very different from the other, feudal provinces. From 1753, the Intendenza Capitanale di Fiume Tersatto e Buccari executed the orders of its head office in Trieste. The Fiuman luogotenente of the Cesarea Regia Luogotenenza Governale del Capitanato di Fiume, Tersatto e Buccari, played the role of the captain, and his jurisdiction extended from Moschienizze to Carlopago. The Intendenza transmitted orders to the justice rectors in Fiume. Thereby the autonomy of the local institutions (the justice rectors previously headed the communal administration) was gradually eroded.

Charles VI also founded the institution of a "privileged company" in Fiume. The purpose of this measure was to attract foreign investments, but the first companies were controlled from the chamber in Vienna and went bankrupt. A turn of affairs came in 1750, with the foundation of Urban Arnold & Co., with its seat in Antwerp. Initially, it dealt with the refinement of sugar, and the production of potash, tallow candles, and salted meat. It possessed its own port basin, and the number of its sugar refining plants grew from one to five. By 1754, the company was supplying the monarchy with sugar, which became its main traded article. The company was bigger than anything Fiume had previously seen. It employed more than 1000 at a time when the city had little more than 5000 inhabitants. The company brought new life to the Fiuman economy and started many spin-offs (candle and rope factories, etc.). Industrial production in the city rose rapidly: in 1771 it was valued at 802,582 florins, in 1780 ƒ2,278,000. The value of imports in 1771 was ƒ1,187,000, in 1780 ƒ2,781,000. Exports in 1771 were valued at ƒ496,000, in 1780 ƒ1,340,000; but that valuation was probably even higher, according to the Ragusan diplomat Luka Sorkočević, who in 1782 stayed in Fiume. In his private diary he estimated the added value of the Fiuman economy (based on the value of its exported goods) at ƒ2.5 million.

Corpus separatum 

During the 1740s, most of the trade of the Pannonian plain was starting to pass through Fiume and not Dubrovnik (Ragusa), which after the retreat of the Ottoman Empire never regained its lost ground. After a series of formal acts of protest by the Hungarian and Croat landed estates, Joseph II – during his 1775–1776 journey through Croatia, the littoral, and Venice – decided on the abolition of the Litorale Austriaco. In the same year the Provincia Mercantile was suspended.

By Maria Theresa's handschrift of 2 October 1776, the city of Fiume and the Croatian seaboard, which had previously been under the same administration as the rest of the Austrian littoral, was annexed to the kingdoms of Croatia and Hungary. The empress donated these lands as compensation for those lands that were put under the direct imperial administration as the osterreichische Militargrenze (military frontier) against the Turks. Fiume was originally meant to be given to the Hungarian kingdom, with a view to fostering its trade; but since Hungary proper was some  distant, under the act the city was annexed to Croatia whose territory began right beyond the city walls.

Count , acting as Hungarian royal commissioner, took over the town from Baron Pasquale Ricci, the representative of the Intendancy from Trieste.

Although the kingdom of Croatia was united with that of Hungary, and together they formed the "Lands of the Holy Crown of St Stephen", the Fiumani protested; and with the support of the Hungarian Vice-Regency Council, two-and-a-half years later Maria Theresa (as Queen of Hungary) issued a royal rescript of 23 April 1779 by which Fiume was directly annexed to Hungary as a corpus separatum adnexum sacra hungaricae coronae (separate land attached to the Hungarian crown; i.e., not as a part of Croatia, which was in only a personal union with Hungary). Since Fiume had to serve a similar "emporial" function for Hungary as Trieste did for the Habsburg lands, the Hungarian estates (and most probably the queen) wanted to grant the city a degree of institutional autonomy similar to that enjoyed by Trieste.

According to the 1779 rescript, Fiume, as a corpus separatum, had greater autonomy than a royal free city, or comitatus. It was a territory comparable to the other partes adnexae (annexed parts) constituting the Crown of St. Stephen. Its position was thus comparable to those of the regna: as Trieste was considered to be a crown land of the Habsburg hereditary lands (Erblande) so Fiume was considered to be a parte adnexa to the Hungarian crown.

After the 1779 rescript, the stage was set for all the later political confrontations that would occur in Fiume for more than a century and a half, the history that followed resulting from differing interpretations of the acts of 1776 and 1779. The acts presented a precedent for Hungarian constitutional praxis, since it was the first time that a part of the Holy Roman Empire (and a hereditary fief of the Habsburgs) was given to the Hungarian–Croatian kingdom. Therefore, since the Croatian and Hungarian estates had widely diverging interests with respect to Fiume, they interpreted the rescript differently.

From that moment on the two kingdoms never ceased to argue over who should possess Fiume. The Fiumani, as a third party, gave their reading that Fiume, as a corpus separatum, was autonomous. Given the institutional instability that characterized the period from 1779 to 1848, this was more or less true.

The gubernium of Fiume 

The Fiuman territory was to form the new comitatus of Severin, which also included all the confiscated possessions of the Frangipane and Zrinski families that surrounded Fiume. As it was to be the main Hungarian port, it was detached from the Holy Roman Empire, and a gubernium, or governorate, its governor being selected from the ranks of the Hungarian aristocracy, was established, which allowed Fiume to retain the autonomous status it enjoyed under the Habsburgs. Fiume was the only city in Hungary (Croatia included) that had such an institution. The development of the port needed large investments that only Hungary could supply.

The Croatians refused to accept the Hungarian reading of the 1779 rescript – they denied that the city could be excluded from the surrounding territory, which was already framed into a comitatus. Since the Croatian estates never accepted the Hungarian interpretation, the constitutional position of the city was always uncertain. This changed when the Croatian Diet voted for the suspension of the short-lived Croatian Vice-regency Council in Vienna, whose prerogatives were now entirely devolved upon the Hungarian Vice-regency Council, now the supreme administrative authority for Croatia as well.

Fiume became the administrative centre for two very different, and overlapping, administrative units: the gubernium of Fiume and the comitatus of Severin (Severinska Županija), which was an integral part of Croatia. Arguably the simultaneous existence of the two competing offices reflects the still unsettled dispute between the Hungarian and the Croat estates. The predictable outcome of this clash came in 1787, when Joseph II dissolved the county of Severin, confirming its transitory nature, and introduced a new province (instead of a constituted comitatus of nobles): the "Hungarian littoral", which extended from Fiume to Senj. In Fiume, the Cesareo Regio Governatorato per il Litorale in Fiume governed the new province, thereby eliminating Croatian governance over this stretch of land.

In 1790, for the first time, the representatives of Fiume unofficially took part at the gathering of the Hungarian parliament. They claimed that Fiume was annexed to Hungary, but the annexation was postponed three times by Habsburg monarchs: in 1790, 1802, and 1805. Finally, in 1807, Fiume formally became a part of Hungary. The Fiuman governor had a right to vote in the Chamber of Magnates of the Royal Hungarian Diet (Orszaggyules), while "the deputies of Fiume" (probably two, although their number was still not specified by law) had the right to vote as members of the Stände und Orden. Fiume formally became part of the Hungarian Orszag, but in fact that status was very much in doubt.

Judicial system (1790s) 

In the 1790s, the gubernium of Fiume came under Hungarian administration in terms of commercial and economic policies, but the comitatus of Zagreb still retained its competency in matters of the judiciary and public education. But, these capacities were insignificant, since in Fiume higher education, initially established by the Jesuits in the 17th century, was replaced by Hungarians after the suppression of that order. Also, in Fiume the judiciary competencies were retained by the local patricians; and, de facto, the comitatus of Zagreb and the Croatian estates in Fiume were powerless, since the gubernium acted as a court of appeal (Capitanale Consiglio e Sede Criminale) for both the commercial and civil courts in Fiume.

|- 
|style="text-align: left;"|Notes:

Illyrian Provinces (1809–1813) 

The stability that should have followed the legal settlement of 1807 did not last long. The decade after the French revolution witnessed a series of wars in which the Habsburgs were involved. After two brief occupations, in 1797 and 1805, a French government was introduced in 1809, with Fiume included in the "Illyrian provinces", whose capital was in Ljubljana. The city constituted a special "District of Fiume" within civil Croatia, with 3 districts – Karlovac, Fiume, Senj – with the district seat in Karlovac.

The French were to make of the Illyrian provinces a bridge to oriental trade, so there was a considerable rise of the land-based traffic with the Levant.  After the Treaty of Tilsit (July 1807), the British Navy imposed a blockade of the Adriatic Sea, which brought merchant shipping to a standstill. This seriously affected the economies of the Dalmatian port cities. The English, with their base on the island of Lissa, soon became masters of the Adriatic. On 22 October 1810, an attempt by joint French and Italian forces to seize the British-held island failed.

Napoleon's exclusively land-based customs enforcers could not stop British smugglers, especially as these operated with the connivance of Napoleon's chosen rulers of Spain, Westphalia, and other German states, which faced severe shortages of goods from the French colonies. The embargo encouraged British merchants to aggressively seek out new markets and to engage in smuggling with continental Europe. In Fiume, Andrea Lodovico de Adamich emerged to become the wealthiest and most powerful merchant.

In August 1813, Austria declared war on France. Austrian troops led by General Franjo Tomašić invaded the Illyrian provinces. Croat troops enrolled in the French army switched sides. On 26 August 1813, the Irish-born Laval Nugent von Westmeath, serving the Austrian Empire, liberated the town from the reign of the "Illyrian passing glory".

Restoration (1814–1848) 

Vienna was reluctant to reincorporate "Transsavan Croatia" (or "Illyrian Croatia"), probably because of Metternich's policy towards the region. Under the Restoration, from 1814 to 1822, Fiume was part of the ephemeral "Kingdom of Illyria". By the end of Austrian rule (1823), including the first Hungarian period (1776–1809), Fiume hardly developed – only minor constructions took place. The number of inhabitants shows a slight increase: in 1777 the population was 5,312, in 1819 it was 8,345.

Francis I, by an order of 1 June 1822, gave back Fiume to Hungary, to form the centre of the Hungarial littoral (Littorale Hungaricum), with the ports of Buccari, Portoré and Novi. The new Hungarian governor, Antal Majláth (son of József Majláth, the first Hungarian governor in Fiume) took over on 15 October 1822. Emperor Francis, by an 1822 rescript, made the Kreise of Carlstadt and Fiume autonomous, and, in November 1822, restored the comitatus of Severin.

Fiume was invited to participate in the Croatian diet in Zagreb, where Antun Mihanović (1796-1861), then employed as the governor's secretary, was sent. In 1825–26, Mihanović and Andrea Lodovico Adamich (1766–1828) participated in the Hungarian diet in Presburg, where Adamich tried to promote a project for a Hungarian commercial company centred in Fiume by circulating a memo (eszrevetelek) with scant success. Afterwards, Adamich served as mercantile deputy of Fiume from 1827 until his death in 1828.

Fiuman deputies participated as observers to the Croatian diets of 1830 and 1832. Far more important were the Hungarian diets from 1832 to 1836, which marked the beginning of a period of liberal reforms in Hungary. Under article XIX of the Hungarian law of 1836, the Fiuman judiciary was firmly made a part of the Hungarian judicial system, and the local civic magistrate lost his judicial capacities, which were transferred to a local court, the Giudizio Civico Distrettuale della fedelissima Città, Porto franco e Distretto di Fiume ("District Civil Court of the faithful City, Free Port, and District of Rijeka").

After the death of Adamich, Giuseppe Cimiotti became deputy for Fiume at the Hungarian diet, serving in 1836 first as observer, and then taking active part in 1843–4. One of his first task as a deputy, together with Mihály Horhy, was to draft a plan to politically modernize Fiume, while preserving its autonomy within the Hungarian political system. After the inclusion of the city in the Hungarian system, Cimiotti exploited the request (Torvenyjavaslat a Hajdúkerületrol 1843/4) advanced by Hajdú County (Hajdúság), which constituted a "warrior estate" within Hungarian feudal society that were emancipated in 1604-1606 by István Bocskay, Lord of Bihar, from the jurisdiction of their lords. As the Hajdú, Jász, and  Cuman districts were freed of their feudal obligations of providing military service, so Fiume would be exempted from providing maritime service to Hungary. Cimiotti also took the privileges granted to the Gölnicbánya (German: Göllnitz) miners, who, as Bavarian settlers invited by the king of Hungary, were granted special privileges.

The Industrial Revolution was well under way: already in 1827 the Smith & Meynier paper mill was founded. In 1842, in order to get support for the modernization of the port, the "mercantile deputation" of Fiume sent Ferenc Császár to lobby at the exchange court in Pest. In 1843, Josef Bainville, a French engineer from Fiume, reproposed an older French plan, which had been commissioned by Adamich during the Illyrian-provinces era. Bainville settled in Hungary and created a plan for the city of Szeged.

In 1842, ambitious plans for advancing trade with Hungary, Wallachia, and the Banat were advanced; and Cimiotti involved the engineer Mario A. Sanfermo, who elaborated a plan to connect Fiume with the Sissek–Carlstadt railroad and its extension to Vukovar, thereby reaching Serbia and Wallachia. The Fiume–Vukovar Railroad, intended for containing Russia in the context of the Eastern Question, was enthusiastically supported by Lajos Kossuth; and the founding of a company – Vukovar–Fiumana Unitae Societatis Pestano Fluminensis ad construendam semitam ferratam – was voted on by the Hungarian diet in 1848. The well-known debates between Kossuth and István Széchenyi (who visited Fiume in 1844 and decided to allocate ƒ260,000 for port modernization) on how to build the railway leading from central Hungary to Fiume, took place in Fiume in 1846. In the same year an article by Kossuth, titled "To the Sea Hungarians! Go to the Sea!" was published in a periodical of the Trade Association.

In 1846, Vincenzo de Domini (1816-1903) became professor at the local nautical school. A Venetian patriot, close to the circles of Kossuth, he was entrusted, together with Gaspare Matcovich and Spiridione Gopcevich (1815 - 1861) with a project to turn the frigate Implacabile into a Hungarian man-of-war. The arming of the ship, which was commanded by de Domini, led Jelačić to send an expedition of Croat troops to occupy Fiume on 31 August 1848.

1848-1870

Hungarian port 1870-1918 

Following the creation of Austria-Hungary by the Compromise of 1867, Fiume was attached to Hungary for the third and last time in 1870. Croatia had constitutional autonomy within Hungary, but as Hungary's only international port, the city became an independent corpus separatum, governed directly from Budapest by an appointed governor. Austria's Trieste and Hungary's Fiume competed for maritime trade.

Giovanni de Ciotta (mayor from 1872 to 1896, with a brief interruption in 1884) proved to be the preeminent local political leader. Under his leadership, an impressive phase of expansion of the city started, marked by major port development, fueled by the general expansion of international trade and the city's connection (1873) to the Hungarian and Austrian railway networks. Hungarian support proved to be crucial to the development of the port of Fiume, and Ciotta was the key person in assuring it. Following the financial crisis of 1873, which culminated in 1875, the conservative liberal Deák Party faced a crisis from which it survived only by a merger with the more numerous conservative Left Centre of Kálmán Tisza. The "new" Liberal Party of Hungary was to rule Hungary (and Fiume) from 1875 to 1890, marking the golden years of Ciotta, which were later known as the Idyll.

Ciotta led the start of an impressive phase of expansion of the city, marked by the completion of the Fiume–Budapest railway, the construction of the modern port, and the establishment of modern industrial and commercial enterprises, such as the Royal Hungarian Sea Navigation Company "Adria", and the Whitehead Torpedo Works. In 1866, Robert Whitehead, manager of Stabilimento Tecnico Fiumano (an Austrian engineering company engaged in providing engines for the Austro-Hungarian Navy), experimented with the first torpedo. Ciotta's contribution was crucial as he financed Whitehead's efforts to produce a viable torpedo. Modern industrial and commercial enterprises – such as the paper mill situated in the Rječina canyon, which produced world renowned cigarette paper – became trademarks of the city.

The population grew from 21,000 in 1880 to 50,000 in 1910. A number of major civic buildings went up during that time, including the governor's palace designed by the Hungarian architect Alajos Hauszmann. In 1885, the sumptuous new theatre was finished, modelled on those of Budapest and Vienna, creating a political crisis for Ciotta in 1884, on account of their building costs. While on army service, Ciotta met John Leard, a Fiuman of English origins. In 1889, Ciotta and Leard initiated the piano regolatore, a comprehensive urbanisation plan for the city. The new plan laid out a modern commercial city, which would require destroying most of the older buildings and roads and introducing the regular planning, as was done in Budapest and other cities of the time. In 1891, the Acquedotto Ciotta was finished, providing the city with a modern water supply and sewage system. Ciotta was also a founder of several philanthropic institutions.

In 1896, the "Ciotta system" underwent a crisis, when Hungarian Prime Minister Dezső Bánffy initiated a policy of centralization. Ciotta, being unable to assure equilibrium between Fiume and Hungary, resigned and retired to private life, following the example of Governor Lajos gróf Batthyány de Nemetujvár. In response Michele Maylender, backed by Luigi Ossoinack (initiator of the Royal Hungarian Sea Navigation Company "Adria"), founded a new party, the Autonomist Association, ending the rule of the Liberal Party of Hungary in Fiume.

At the turn of the 20th century, the future mayor of New York City Fiorello La Guardia lived in the city and reportedly even played football for the local sports club.

The Italo-Yugoslav dispute and the Free State 

Habsburg-ruled Austria-Hungary's disintegration in the closing weeks of World War I, in the fall of 1918, led to the establishment of rival Croatian and Italian administrations in the city; both Italy and the founders of the new Kingdom of the Serbs, Croats and Slovenes (later the Kingdom of Yugoslavia) claimed sovereignty based on their "irredentist" ("unredeemed") ethnic populations.

In November 1918, an international force of Italian, French, Serbian, British, and American troops occupied the city, and the city's future was discussed at the Paris Peace Conference during the course of 1919.

Italy based its claim on the fact that Italians were the largest single nationality within the city, 88% of the population. Croats made up most of the remainder and were also a majority in the surrounding area, including the neighbouring town of Sušak. Andrea Ossoinack, who had been the last delegate from Fiume to the Hungarian Parliament, was admitted to the conference as a representative of Fiume, and essentially supported the Italian claims.

On 10 September 1919,  the Treaty of Saint-Germain was signed, which declared the Austro-Hungarian monarchy dissolved. Negotiations over the future of the city were interrupted two days later when a force of Italian nationalist irregulars led by the poet Gabriele d'Annunzio seized control of the city by force; d'Annunzio eventually established a state, the Italian Regency of Carnaro.

The resumption of Italy's premiership by the liberal Giovanni Giolitti in June 1920 signalled a hardening of official attitudes to d'Annunzio's coup. On 12 November, Italy and Yugoslavia concluded the Treaty of Rapallo, under which Rijeka was to be an independent state, the Free State of Fiume, under a regime acceptable to both. D'Annunzio's response was characteristically flamboyant and of doubtful judgment: his declaration of war against Italy invited the bombardment by Italian royal forces that led to his surrender of the city at the end of the year, after a five days' resistance. Italian troops took over in January 1921. The election of an autonomist-led constituent assembly for the territory did not put an end to strife: a brief Italian nationalist seizure of power was ended by the intervention of an Italian royal commissioner, and a short-lived local Fascist takeover in March 1922 ended in a third Italian military occupation. Seven months later Italy herself fell under Fascist rule.

Fiume under Fascist rule 
A period of diplomatic acrimony closed with the Treaty of Rome (27 January 1924), which assigned Fiume to Italy and Sušak to Yugoslavia, with joint port administration. Formal Italian annexation (16 March 1924) inaugurated twenty years of Italian government, followed by twenty months of German military occupation in World War II. In 1938, Temistocle Testa, prefect from Udine, became prefect of the province of Carnaro.

Rijeka in World War II 

After the surrender of Italy to the Allies in September 1943, Rijeka and the surrounding territories were occupied by Germany, becoming part of the Adriatic littoral zone. Because of its industries (oil refinery, torpedo factory, shipyards) and its port facilities, the city was a target of frequent Anglo-American air attacks. Some of the worst attacks happened on 12 January 1944  (attack on the refinery, part of the Oil Campaign), on 3–6 November 1944, when a series of attacks resulted in at least 125 deaths, and between 15 and 25 February 1945 (200 dead, 300 wounded). The harbour area was destroyed by retreating German troops at the very end of the war. Yugoslav troops entered the city on 3 May 1945, after heavy fighting.

Post–World War II expulsion of Italians 

The aftermath of the war saw the city's fate once again resolved by a combination of force and diplomacy. This time (early May 1945), Yugoslav troops advanced as far west as Trieste in their campaign against the German occupiers. Rijeka thus became Croatian (i.e., Yugoslav), a situation formalised by the Paris peace treaty of 10 February 1947 between Italy and the wartime Allies. Once the change in sovereignty was formalised, 58,000 of the 66,000 Italian-speakers (known in Italian as esuli or the exiled ones) were more or less hastily pushed, by various means, out of the city. The discrimination and persecution many of them experienced at the hands of the Yugoslav officials in the last days of World War II and the first 9 years of peace remained painful memories. Summary executions of alleged fascists (who at times were proven anti-fascists), Italian public servants, military officials, and even normal civilians; limited acts of terrorism; imprisonment; and loss of work and public positions forced most ethnic Italians to abandon Rijeka in order to avoid further violence. The Trieste crisis in 1954 gave the final pretext to Yugoslav authorities to strip the local Italian-speaking populace of most of its remaining rights and enact a more radical and successful assimilation of the remaining Italians into the new Yugoslav majority.

Within Yugoslavia 

Because of its importance for the country, the shipbuilding industry was from 1947 until 1954 under the responsibility of the Ministry of National Defence. In 1948 the main shipyard, renamed Maj 3 (May 3), was to serve as a base for the restored shipbuilding industry. In 1949, it launched the first post-war Yugoslav ship, the MB Zagreb of 4000 DWT. Along with the shipbuilding industry would develop one for marine equipment. After being rebuilt, the torpedo factory started to produce diesel engines. The former Skull Foundry, now Svjetlost, was devoted to the production of electrical navigation equipment, while the Rikard Benčić factory manufactured watercraft and other auxiliary equipment. In 1948, the oil refinery was back to pre-war production, processing 110,000 tonnes; in the early Fifties it was able to process 200,000 tonnes of oil. At the time, it was supplying 37.6% of the country's needs.

From 1960 to 1990, Rijeka was a city that aspired to the greatest achievements and equipped a heavy industry while dreaming of a Utopian tomorrow. After Edo Jardas, the mayors were Franjo Širola (1959–1964), Nikola Pavletić (1964–1968), Dragutin Haramija (1968–1969), Neda Andrić (1969–1974), Nikola Pavletić for the second time (1974–1979), Vilim Mulc (1979–1982), Josip Štefan (1982–1984), Zdravko Saršon (1985–1987), and Željko Lužavec (1988–1993). The majority of mayors came from small towns in the immediate surrounding area.

The traffic of the port complex had increased from 420,000 tons in 1946 to more than 20,000,000 tons in 1980. The port was involved in more than 50% of traffic across the country and about 80% in terms of its sea transit. In 1980, Rijeka handled 20% of exports from Croatia and 10% of those of Yugoslavia. In 1980, when the merchant navy was at its peak, Rijeka's shipping had a cargo capacity of 500,000 tons. Jugolinija was the largest shipping company of the country, while Jadrolinija had 49 ships and provided passenger transportation service by ferry-boats. Approximately 23,000 people were employed in industry in that year. Over 80% of the total industrial production was by the energy sector (electric power industry, oil processing, and coal), as well as shipbuilding. This, coupled with the low number of finished products, explains why the industry of Rijeka collapsed in the early 1990s. In 1982 there were 92,489 employees out of a population of 193,000. The oil refinery treated 8,000,000 tonnes – 28% of the country's total turnover. The plant had been based in Urinj since 1966. In the Eighties the construction of a petrochemical complex in Omišalj began, which later posted one of the biggest losses in the country. The Maj 3 shipyard handled about one third of the shipbuilding industry. The peak in production was achieved between 1971 and 1975, when 32 ships were built, totalling more than 1,200,000 gross tons. These vessels were mainly for export. In the Eighties smaller boats were built and production increased to employ 7,000 shipyard workers, and Maj 3 became the largest company in Rijeka. At the same time the Viktor Lenac Shipyard in Martinščica became the largest repair yard in the Mediterranean.

The development of the metalworking industry was linked to the needs of shipbuilding. Thus Vulkan manufactured cranes for the Rikard Benčić ship pumps, Torpedo manufactured diesel engines and tractors, Rade Končar built electric generators, while Metalografički Kombinat was directed towards the production of metal packaging for the purposes of refinery. Civil engineering was expanding to the point that cooperatives such as Primorje, Jadran, Kvarner, and Konstruktor employed some 10,000 workers overall in 1981. More than 6,000 of them were engaged in commerce with Brodokomerc. This was reflected in the construction of many new residential buildings in the city, such as the five buildings in Škurinje, all 26 floors in height.

The Ghetaldus Building on Korzo, designed by Zdenko Kolacio (1949), opens the period of modern architecture. Josip Uhlik designed the building of Social Insurance. Igor Emili created designs for Užarška (1959) and Šporerova (1968) streets, the department store Varteks (1975), the Ri-Adria bank (1986, later Jugobanka) in the old part of the city, and also for the Kraš (1964) and Brodomaterijal II (1970) buildings on Korzo. Ada Felice-Rošić designed the Korzo store (1972) with a front flanking an access to the old part of town, while Ninoslav and Vjera Kučan designed the department store RI (1974). A series of office buildings are the work of Vladimir Grubešić: Jadroagent (1977–1984), Delta (1983–1984), Privredna banka Zagreb (1986), and Jadrosped – all located in the old part of town – as well as the Croatia Lines (1982–1992). One of the most notable achievements was the construction of the Riječka banka, according to a draft Kazimir Oštrogović (1966). The Museum of the Revolution (now the Municipal Museum) was designed by Neven Šegvić (1976), and the office tower at HPT-Centar Kozala was designed by N. Kučan and V. Antolović (1975). The architect Boris Magaš is the designer of two major buildings: the Faculty of Law (1980, with Olga Magaš), and the Church of St. Nicholas (1981–1988).

Within independent Croatia

See also 
 Corpus separatum (Fiume)
 Postage stamps and postal history of Fiume
 List of governors and heads of state of Fiume
 Other names of Rijeka
 Timeline of Rijeka history
 Imperial Estate
 Free Imperial City
 List of states of the Holy Roman Empire
 History of Croatia
 History of Slovenia
 History of Austria
 History of Hungary

References

Bibliography

External links 

 Europeana. Items related to Rijeka, various dates.
  (Map of Fiume region).

 
Rijeka
History of Dalmatia